John William Tinn (20 January 1878 - 13 March 1971) was an English football manager. He managed South Shields in the early 1920s and Portsmouth from 1927 until 1947.

Career
Tinn became manager of South Shields in 1919, the year they were elected to the Football League Second Division. After several seasons of the club finishing in the top half of the table, he joined Portsmouth in 1927. Under Tinn's stewardship Portsmouth won the FA Cup for the first time in their history when they beat Wolverhampton Wanderers 4-1 at Wembley in 1939. Although Tinn departed in 1947 he is still credited with creating the great Pompey side which went on to win back-to-back league championships in 1949 and 1950. He famously credited the 1939 cup success to his 'lucky spats' which he wore in every round. He also guided Pompey to the 1929 and 1934 cup finals.

Honours won

As a manager
Portsmouth
FA Cup winner 1939
FA Cup runner-up 1929 and 1934

References

English football managers
Gateshead A.F.C. managers
Portsmouth F.C. managers
1878 births
1971 deaths